Kona Srikar Bharat (born 3 October 1993) is an Indian international cricketer who plays as a wicket-keeper batsman for Indian cricket team and Andhra in domestic cricket. In February 2015, he became the first wicket-keeper batsman to score a triple hundred in the Ranji Trophy. In February 2023, he made his Test debut for India against Australia.

Early life
K. S. Bharat was born in Visakhapatnam on 3 October 1993 to Kona Srinivas Rao, a master craftsman at the city's naval dockyard, and Manga Devi, a housewife. He studied at the St. Aloysius High School and graduated from Dr. Lankapalli Bullayya College with a BCom degree.

Bharat began training with the Andhra Ranji Trophy squad at the age of 11. He was one of the ball boys for the India-Pakistan ODI match at Visakhapatnam in 2005. He started keeping wickets at the age of 19.

Domestic and T20 franchise career
In February 2015, he became the first wicket-keeper batsman to score a triple hundred in the Ranji Trophy. 

In 2015, he was signed up for 10 lakh by the Indian Premier League franchise Delhi Daredevils. He did not get a game and was released ahead of the next season. In July 2018, he was named in the squad for India Blue for the 2018–19 Duleep Trophy.

In February 2021, Bharat was bought by the Royal Challengers Bangalore in the IPL auction ahead of the 2021 Indian Premier League. He played several matches and gained popularity after his last-ball six against Delhi Capitals.

In February 2022, he was bought by the Delhi Capitals in the auction for the 2022 Indian Premier League for 2 crore. Like 2015, he did not get a game and was released for the next season.

In December 2022, he was bought by the Gujarat Titans in the auction for the 2023 Indian Premier League for 1.2 crore.

International career
In November 2019, Bharat was added to India's Test squad for the second Test against Bangladesh, as cover for Wriddhiman Saha. In January 2020, he was added to Indian's squad for the One Day International (ODI) series against Australia, after Rishabh Pant suffered a concussion.

In January 2021, he was named as one of five standby players in India's Test squad for their series against England. In May 2021, Bharat was added to India's Test squad for their series against England as cover for Wriddhiman Saha.

In November 2021, Bharat took the field in the first Test for India against defending world test champions New Zealand during the New Zealand tour of India in 2021 as a replacement for the injured Wriddhiman Saha. In the match he kept wicket and took 2 catches behind the stumps, also dismissing Tom Latham for 95 by stumping him off of Axar Patel's bowling.

In February 2022, Bharat was named in India's Test squad for their series against Sri Lanka. In May 2022, he was again named in India's Test squad, this time for the rescheduled fifth Test against England.

On 9 February 2023, Bharat made his Test debut against Australia at Vidarbha Cricket Association Stadium, Nagpur.

Personal life
Bharat married his longtime girlfriend Anjali Nedunuri in 2020.

References

External links
 

Indian cricketers
Living people
1993 births
Andhra cricketers
Delhi Capitals cricketers
Cricketers from Visakhapatnam
India Red cricketers
India Blue cricketers
Indian A cricketers
People from East Godavari district
Royal Challengers Bangalore cricketers
Telugu people
Wicket-keepers